The Black Captain (Italian: Il capitano nero) is a 1951 Italian historical adventure film directed by  Giorgio Ansoldi and Alberto Pozzetti and starring Steve Barclay, Marina Berti and Paul Muller.

The film's sets were designed by Alfredo Montori. It was shot at the Cinecittà studios in Rome during 1950 but released the following year. It earned around 202 million lira at the domestic box office.

A swashbuckler set in sixteenth century Italy, it sees Count Marco Adinolfi battling against two rivals.

Cast
 Steve Barclay as Marco Adinolfi  
 Marina Berti as Barbara Vivaldi 
 Paul Muller as Giuliano  
 Marisa Merlini as Lucrezia Adinolfi 
 Mario Ferrari as Duca Fabrizzio Di Corvara
 Fedele Gentile as Prospero Venturini 
 Andrea Checchi as Fratello Di Marco e Lucrezia  
 Roberto Risso as Paolo Adinolfi 
 Franca Marzi 
 Leo Garavaglia 
 Carlo Borelli

References

Bibliography
 Chiti, Roberto & Poppi, Roberto. Dizionario del cinema italiano: Dal 1945 al 1959. Gremese Editore, 1991.
 Parish, Robert. Film Actors Guide. Scarecrow Press, 1977.

External links

1951 films
1950s historical adventure films
Italian historical adventure films
1950s Italian-language films
Films shot at Cinecittà Studios
Italian black-and-white films
1950s Italian films